
San José de Gracia may refer to several places in Mexico:

Aguascalientes
San José de Gracia, Aguascalientes
San José de Gracia (municipality)

Jalisco
San Jose de Gracia, Jalisco

Michoacán
San José de Gracia, Michoacán

See also
San José (disambiguation)